The 2000 Summer Olympics, officially known as the Games of the XXVII Olympiad, were a summer multi-sport event held in Sydney, New South Wales, Australia, from 15 September to 1 October 2000. A total of 10,651 athletes from 199 nations represented by National Olympic Committees (NOCs) (with four individual athletes from East Timor) competed in 300 events in 28 sports.

Athletes from 80 countries won at least one medal. The United States won the most medals overall with 93, as well as the most gold (37) medals. Host nation Australia finished the Games with 58 medals overall (16 gold, 25 silver, and 17 bronze). Cameroon, Colombia, Latvia, Mozambique and Slovenia won a gold medal for the first time in their Olympic histories, while Vietnam, Barbados, Macedonia, Kuwait, Kyrgyzstan, and Saudi Arabia won their first ever Olympic medals.


Medal table

The ranking in this table is based on information provided by the International Olympic Committee.

The ranking sorts by the number of gold medals earned by a country—in this context, an entity represented by a National Olympic Committee. The number of silver medals is taken into consideration next and then the number of bronze medals. If, after the above, countries are still tied, equal ranking is given and they are listed alphabetically.

Key
 Host nation (Australia)

Changes in medal standings

See also

 All-time Olympic Games medal table
 2000 Summer Paralympics medal table

References

External links
 
 
 

Medal table
2000